Alessandra Vidal de Negreiros Negrini (born 29 August 1970) is a Brazilian actress. She is known for her roles in Brazilian telenovelas and films. She began her television career after starring in Olho no Olho (1993) playing the role of Clara. In film, her first role was Lília in the Four Days in September movie. This opened up gates for her as she has starred in over a dozen telenovelas and in television series since then. In telenovelas she is known for her roles in Desejos de Mulher (2002), Paraíso Tropical (2007), Lado a Lado (2012), Boogie Oogie (2014).

Her portrayal of twins in Paraíso Tropical earned her accolades such as Minha Awards, Festival and Brasília Awards.

Biography 
The daughter of engineer Luiz Eduardo Osório Negrini, and pedagogue Neusa Vidal de Negreiros, who is descended from André Vidal de Negreiros,  Alessandra, who has Portuguese and Italian ancestry, has a brother named Paulo Roberto, who spent his childhood and adolescence in Santos. At 18 she enrolled in a theater course, and at that time, was called to do tests on Rede Globo.

Career 
Her TV debut was in the telenovela Olho no Olho, Antônio Calmon. In 1995, she starred in the miniseries starring Engraçadinha... Seus Amores e Seus Pecados, based on the work of Nelson Rodrigues.

In 2000, she began playing Isabel Olinto in the critically acclaimed miniseries A Muralha, a tribute to 500 years in Brazil. Because of the sensual appeal of her character in the miniseries, she was featured on the cover of the Brazilian edition of Playboy magazine in April of that year. On February 3, 2000, Negrini was arrested for taking her three-year-old son Antônio to a Leblon showing of Sleepy Hollow which was rated 18+ by the Brazilian advisory rating system.

In 2002, Negrini received accolades for voicing the villain Selma in a recording of the novel Desejos de Mulher by Euclydes Marinho. In 2003, he participated in the children's series Sítio do Picapau Amarelo, playing Rapunzel. In 2004, she made an appearance on the soap opera Celebridade, Gilberto Braga. 
In the theater, she attended parts of Os Credores and A Gaivota, in which she traveled to Europe, Canada and Japan.

In 2006, she participated, as the socialite, Yedda Schidmt, from the miniseries JK, which tells the story of Juscelino Kubitschek.

In 2007, she starred in the soap opera Paraíso Tropical. In the plot, the actress played the twin sisters Paula and Taís. The same year she premiered the film Cleópatra, Júlio Bressane, for which she won the best actress award at the Festival de Brasília. In 2008, she appeared in two more films: A Erva do Rato, of Júlio Bressane and No Retrovisor of Mauro Mendonça Filho.

Negrini returned to television in 2010 to participate in the series S.O.S. Emergência and As Cariocas.

In 2011, Negrini returned to the stage alongside Karin Rodrigues, to stage the play A Senhora de Dubuque, a text by Edward Albee. And was in the movie O Abismo Prateado and TokyoShow.

In 2012, she participated in the new version of the play A Propósito de Senhorita Júlia. The story takes place in Brazil at the beginning of the 21st century. In the same year, she starred in Lado a Lado, playing opera singer Catarina Ribeiro.

In 2014, Alessandra played Susana in Boogie Oogie, the novel by Rui Vilhena, replacing Meu Pedacinho de Chão. From October to December 2017, it is in poster with the piece the A Volta ao Lar, directed by Regina Duarte.

In 2018 returns the television interpreting the villain Susana in the novel Orgulho e Paixão. The character works for Julieta (Gabriela Duarte), a woman who has grown rich with coffee, and will do anything to become as powerful as her.

Personal life
Negrini was married to actor Murilo Benício from 1998 to 1999. They have one son, actor Antônio Benício.

She was also married to singer Otto from 2001 to 2008, with whom she has one daughter, Betina (born 2003).

Filmography

Television

Film

Theater

Awards and nominations

References

External links 

 

1970 births
Living people
People from São Paulo
Brazilian people of Italian descent
Brazilian people of Portuguese descent
Brazilian telenovela actresses
Brazilian film actresses
Brazilian stage actresses
Actresses from São Paulo